Split: A Divided America is a documentary film about partisan divides in American society. It examines a perceived political divide (Red-States / Blue States, Conservatives and Liberals, Republicans and Democrats) from the perspective of cultural factors (like religion, urbanization, race and wealth), the modern media, contemporary campaigning strategies, and the "deterioration of civil discourse in our political experience".

Kelly Nyks directed, co-wrote, and co-produced the film with co-writer Peter Hutchison and Jeff Beard.  The cast includes Al Franken, Jesse Jackson, Noam Chomsky,  Norm Ornstein, Tucker Carlson, Bruce Bartlett, Thomas Frank, Robert Putnam and Sharon Pratt Kelly among others.

The documentary was broadcast domestically on the Independent Film Channel (IFC) and was distributed to classrooms nationwide in collaboration with the National Association of Secondary School Principals (NASSP) and the National Council for the Social Studies (NCSS).

Awards
 Jury Award, Best Documentary Feature at First Take Film Festival
 Audience Favorite Award, Best Documentary Feature at Riverside International Film Festival
 Best Political Documentary Feature at the Connecticut Film Festival
 Audience Favorite, Hulu Awards
 Target 10 Jury Prize Nominee, AFI Dallas International Film Festival

Official festival selections
AFI Dallas International Film Festival, Sarasota Film Festival, Gloria Film Festival, Connecticut Film Festival, Berkshire International Film Festival, First Take Film Festival, Riverside International Film Festival, deadCENTER Film Festival, Sacramento Film Festival, Mexico City Documentary Film Festival, TallGrass Film Festival, We The People Film Festival, Cinesol Film Festival

Reviews
Documentary Films.Net – review by Bryan Newbury
"Split certainly succeeds at viewing the political situation, so often represented by the primary colors equation, in a more reasoned and deliberate way. We get to see where the real divisions are and how geography, religion, media and money fit into the picture. The film can be said to achieve its objective by illustrating how confusing and complex the American political landscape is."
 http://www.documentaryfilms.net/index.php/split-a-divided-america/

Cinematical - review by Peter Martin
"Walking a veritable tightrope between red and blue states, Nyks travels across the country, talking to a wide cross-section of random citizens, party leaders, political celebrities and media pundits. He winds up with a sincere, thoughtful inquiry into the neuroses of a fractured nation.” 
 http://www.cinematical.com/2008/04/03/afi-dallas-review-split-a-divided-america/

ALL Movie Guide - review by Jason Buchanan
"What does it mean for the future of our country when we can't even discuss our political differences in a civil manner anymore, and who has the authority to say what's truly "right" or "wrong" anyway when it comes to such hot button issues as abortion and gay marriage? Nyks attempts to answer all of these questions and more by interviewing such noted political commentators as Tucker Carlson, Noam Chomsky, Jesse Jackson, and Robert Putnam, and engaging people all across the country in a constructive dialogue about politics in general, and the potentially destructive effects that political partisanship has had on American society as a whole."
 http://www.allmovie.com/work/split-a-divided-america-464

Moving Pictures Magazine - review by Elliot V. Kotek
“Journalists, civil libertarians and evangelists each get their say and Nyks, by serving up the information in bite-sized topical chunks, keeps the conversations tight and on point. By mixing the media with superb graphic animation, film clips and narrated cheat sheets that help keep track of historical context, Nyks not only helps us digest the discourse, but forces us to enjoy it. “
 http://www.movingpicturesmagazine.com/reviews/movies/splitadividedamerica

Pocketreviews –
“the film does a really good job of engaging viewers, minutes in I was hooked ...... this film is a great primer for people interested in breaking out of our system of "divide and conquer" politics and media….Any documentary that gets you talking so much that you want to pause the film and talk in the middle of it is a documentary that is doing its job....  FOUR STARS! ****"
 http://pocketreviews.net/split-a-divided-america-2008

Interviewees
  Al Franken		
  Norm Ornstein		
  Jesse Jackson		
  Noam Chomsky		
  Amy Goodman		
  Thomas Frank		
  Nicholas Kristof		
  Scott Reed		
  Bruce Bartlett		
  Doug Bailey 
  Robert Putnam		
  Linda S. Kauffman		
  Sheila Jackson Lee		
  Jack Hitt		
  Ted Rall		
  Mark Green

External links
 Official website
 
 http://www.ifc.com/movies/n002/n315/n110/n000.php
 https://audience.withoutabox.com/festivals/event_item.php?id=19600
 http://cyberlaw.stanford.edu/documentary-film-program/film/split-divided-america

American documentary films
Documentary films about American politics
2000s American films